Rebecca Hawkins may refer to:

 Rebecca Hawkins (character), fictional character in the Japanese manga series Yu-Gi-Oh!
 Rebecca Hawkins (pioneer woman) (c. 1797-1800–c. 1860), pioneer woman